Çavdarhisar is a town and district of Kütahya Province in the Aegean region of Turkey. According to 2000 census, population of the district is 13,538 of which 4,687 live in the town of Çavdarhisar. The local Kocaçay stream is still crossed by the Roman Penkalas Bridge.

Archaeology 
In January 2021, archaeologists led by Dr. Elif Özer from Pamukkale University announced that they had discovered a cache containing 651 Roman coins dated about 2,100 years ago in a jug buried near a stream in Aizanoi. Researchers revealed a jug firstly in 2019. 439 pieces of coins were denarius (ancient Roman coins minted on silver), and 212 were cistophori, silver coins from Pergamum. Caesar, Brutus, Mark Antony and Augustus Young are engraved on the mostly well-preserved coins. Find is going to display in the Museum of Anatolian Civilizations.

In August 2021, archaeologists from Dumlupinar University announced the discovery of statue of Hygieia. Human sized statue has portrayed with a snake in its arms. The statue was revealed inside the columned gallery throughout the south wing of the agora.

Places of interest
 Aizanoi ancient city of Phrygia

Notes

References

External links

 District governor's official website 

Populated places in Kütahya Province
Districts of Kütahya Province
Phrygia